DKL may refer to:

 Donkey Kong Land, a 1995 video game for the Game Boy
 Nickname for Deokali, industrial area in Uttar Pradesh, India
 Dunlop Kenya Limited, original name for Olympia Capital Holdings, a holding company in India
 Code for Daud Khel Junction railway station, Pakistan
 The Kullback-Leibler divergence, a measure of difference between probability distributions.